Syringa is a genus of 12 currently recognized species of flowering woody plants in the olive family or Oleaceae called lilacs. These lilacs are native to woodland and scrub from southeastern Europe to eastern Asia, and widely and commonly cultivated in temperate areas elsewhere.

The genus is most closely related to Ligustrum (privet), classified with it in Oleaceae tribus Oleeae subtribus Ligustrinae.

Lilacs are used as food plants by the larvae of some moth species, including copper underwing, scalloped oak and Svensson's copper underwing.

Description 

The leaves are opposite (occasionally in whorls of three) in arrangement, and their shape is simple and heart-shaped to broad lanceolate in most species, but pinnate in a few species (e.g. S. protolaciniata, S. pinnatifolia).

Flowers 
The usual flower colour is a shade of purple (often a light purple or "lilac"), but white, pale yellow and pink, and even a dark burgundy color are also found.

The flowers grow in large panicles, and in several species have a strong fragrance. Flowering varies between mid spring to early summer, depending on the species.

Fruit 
The fruit is a dry, brown capsule, splitting in two at maturity to release the two winged seeds.

Etymology 

Taxonomy 
The genus Syringa was first formally described in 1753 by Carl Linnaeus and the description was published in Species Plantarum. The genus name Syringa is derived from Ancient Greek word syrinx meaning "pipe" or "tube" and refers to the hollow branches of S. vulgaris.

Plants of the World Online lists Syringa as a heterotypic synonym of Philadelphus.

Cultivation and uses

Lilacs are popular shrubs in parks and gardens throughout the temperate zone, and several hybrids and numerous cultivars have been developed. The term French lilac is often used to refer to modern double-flowered cultivars, thanks to the work of prolific breeder Victor Lemoine. Lilacs grow most successfully in well-drained soils, particularly those based on chalk. They flower on old wood, and produce more flowers if unpruned. If pruned, the plant responds by producing fast-growing young vegetative growth with no flowers, in an attempt to restore the removed branches. Lilac bushes can be prone to powdery mildew disease.

The wood of lilac is close-grained, diffuse-porous, extremely hard and one of the densest in Europe. The sapwood is typically cream-coloured and the heartwood has various shades of brown and purple. Lilac wood has traditionally been used for engraving, musical instruments, knife handles, etc. When drying, the wood has a tendency to encurve into a twisted form and to split into narrow sticks.

Symbolism 

Lilacs are often considered to symbolize first love.

In Greece, Macedonia, Lebanon, and Cyprus, the lilac is strongly associated with Easter time because it flowers around that time; it is consequently called paschalia.

In the poem When Lilacs Last in the Dooryard Bloom'd, by Walt Whitman, lilacs are a reference to Abraham Lincoln.

Syringa vulgaris is the state flower of New Hampshire, because it "is symbolic of that hardy character of the men and women of the Granite State."

Festivals

Several locations in North America hold annual Lilac Festivals, including:

 The Arnold Arboretum in Boston, Massachusetts, which celebrates "Lilac Sunday" every May. The Arboretum shows off its collection of over 422 lilac plants, of 194 different varieties. Lilac Sunday is the only day of the year when picnicking is allowed on the grounds of the Arboretum.
 Lombard, Illinois, called the "Lilac Village", which has an annual lilac festival and parade in May. The village also contains Lilacia Park, a garden with over 200 varieties of lilacs, as well as over 50 kinds of tulips.
 Mackinac Island, in Michigan, which celebrates a weeklong lilac festival and lilac parade each June.
 Rochester, New York, which has held its Lilac Festival since 1898, hosts the longest-running festival in North America. Held in Highland Park, this celebration features 1,200 shrubs, representing over 500 varieties, many of which were developed in Rochester. It is the largest collection of varieties at any single place.
 The Royal Botanical Gardens near Hamilton, Ontario, which holds its Lilac Celebration each May.
 Spokane, Washington, known as the "Lilac City", which holds an annual lilac festival and lilac parade.
 Franktown, Ontario, Canada, holds an annual festival.

Species
Species and subspecies currently accepted as of July 2016:
Syringa emodi Wall. ex Royle – Himalayan lilac - northern India, Pakistan, Tibet, Nepal
Syringa josikaea J.Jacq. ex Rchb.f. – Hungarian lilac - Carpathian Mountains of Romania and Ukraine
Syringa komarowii C.K.Schneid. – nodding lilac - Gansu, Hubei, Shaanxi, Sichuan, Yunnan
Syringa oblata Lindl. – early blooming lilac or broadleaf lilac - Korea, Gansu, Hebei, Henan, Jilin, Liaoning, Inner Mongolia, Ningxia, Qinghai, Shaanxi, Shandong, Shanxi, Sichuan
Syringa oblata subsp. dilatata – Korean early lilac - Nakai - Korea, Jilin, LiaoningSyringa pinetorum W.W.Sm. – Sichuan, Tibet, YunnanSyringa pinnatifolia Hemsl. – Gansu, Inner Mongolia, Ningxia, Qinghai, Shaanxi, SichuanSyringa pubescens Turcz. – Korea, Gansu, Hebei, Henan, Hubei, Jilin, Liaoning, Ningxia, Qinghai, Shaanxi, Shandong, Shanxi, SichuanSyringa reticulata (Blume) H.Hara (syn. S. pekinensis) – Japanese tree lilac - Primorye, Japan, Korea, Gansu, Hebei, Heilongjiang, Henan, Jilin, Liaoning, Inner Mongolia, Ningxia, Shaanxi, Shanxi, Sichuan Syringa tomentella Bureau & Franch. – Sichuan, Tibet, YunnanSyringa villosa Vahl – villous lilac - Primorye, Korea, Hebei, Shanxi, Heilongjiang, Jilin, Liaoning Syringa vulgaris L. – common lilac - native to Balkans; naturalized in western and central Europe, and many scattered locations in North America

Hybrids
S. × chinensis (S. vulgaris × S. persica)S. × diversifolia (S. oblata × S. pinnatifolia)S. × henryi (S. josikaea × S. villosa)S. × hyacinthiflora (S. oblata × S. vulgaris)S. × josiflexa (S. josikaea × S. komarowii)
S. × laciniata (S. protolaciniata × S. vulgaris) – cut-leaf lilac or cutleaf lilac
S. × persica L. (syn Syringa protolaciniata) – Persian lilac - Afghanistan, Pakistan, western Himalayas, Gansu, QinghaiS. × prestoniae (S. komarowii × S. villosa)S. × swegiflexa (S. komarowii × S. sweginzowii'')

Gallery

References

 
Garden plants
Shrubs
Oleaceae genera